Kushi TV is an Indian Telugu English language kids pay television channel part of Sun TV Network. It was launched on 9 April 2009 and broadcasts cartoons and kids programmes in Telugu & English. Initially, it was a free-to-air channel, but was later converted to a pay channel. Most of the content is similar to its sister channel in Tamil, Chutti TV.

Programming

Regular broadcast 
Happy Birthday
Dora the explorer

Programming 
Oggy and the cockroaches
Kikoriki
Robot Trains
Stuart Little
Tales Of Tatonka
3 Idiots

Auto Raju
Sindubad
Wake Up Music
Happy Birthday
Tian Tian
Ollie & Moon
Shane The Chef
Happy Kid
Boonie Bear - The Adventures
Little Krishna
Maya the Bee (TV series)
SpongeBob SquarePants
Roman Atwood Vlogs
Titeuf
Baal Veer

Former programming 
 Deadly! 
 Creepschool 
 Master Raindrop
 Dragon Booster 
 Magic Wonderland 
 He-Man and the masters of Universe 
 Martha Speaks
 Magic Eye, The Wonder Boy 
 Amar Chitra Katha 
 Geronimo Stilton
 Ultimate Book of Spells 
 Casper and friends
 Nelluru peddareddy evaro telusa?
 WordWorld
 Leonardo
 Danny and daddy
 Harold and the Purple Crayon 
 W.I.T.C.H
 Boohbah
 Bommy and Friends
 Magic Buffalo
 Super Suji
 Galaxy racers
 Code Lyoko
 Heidi
 Jackie Chan Adventures
 Avatar: The Last Airbender
Bandalero

References

Children's television channels in India
Telugu-language television channels
Television channels and stations established in 2009
Television stations in Hyderabad